Carinotetraodon irrubesco, known commonly as the red-tail dwarf puffer, is a freshwater pufferfish found only in the lower Banyuasin basin in South Sumatra and the Sambas River in West Kalimantan.

Characteristics
They live in murky, acidic water amongst submerged vegetation alongside rasboras, pipefish, halfbeaks, and gobies. Like other species in its genus, sexual dimorphism is apparent. Males are larger and coloured brown with creamy stripes on the flanks and dorsal surface, females are smaller and mottled brown in colour with irregular markings on the ventral surface. Both sexes have red eyes but only males possess red tail fins.

Red-tail dwarf puffers are sometimes kept as an aquarium fish, but otherwise have no commercial importance.

In Captivity
It is important that the C.irrubesco is given the provision of a very soft, fine sand substrate - at least 2cm deep (0.79 inches) - so the fish is able to wallow. They will wallow at night when resting and to escape predation during the day.

They best thrive in heavily planted tanks providing much soft leafy coverage. Moss will be used for spawning.

References 

Carinotetraodon
Fishkeeping
Freshwater fish of Indonesia
Fish described in 1999
Endemic fauna of Indonesia
Endemic fauna of Borneo